The East Saginaw and St. Clair Railroad was a wholly owned subsidiary of the Flint and Pere Marquette Railroad (F&PM). It was established in 1872 to construct a branch from the company's main line in East Saginaw, Michigan through The Thumb to Port Huron. In 1889 it was consolidated with the F&PM and ceased to exist as an independent entity.

References 

Railway companies established in 1872
Railway companies disestablished in 1889
Defunct Michigan railroads
Predecessors of the Pere Marquette Railway
American companies disestablished in 1889
American companies established in 1872